Antonio Barbosa Heldt (died September 18, 1973) was a Mexican teacher and politician, member of the Institutional Revolutionary Party.  In 1973, he was elected as Governor of Colima, but died before he could take office. According to official reports, the cause of death was suicide, though that determination was never fully accepted by those close to him.

Books
 Como enseñar a leer y escribir
 Hombres ilustres de México y lugares donde reposan sus restos

See also
Colima

1973 deaths
Institutional Revolutionary Party politicians
Mexican educators
Mexican politicians who committed suicide
Suicides in Mexico
Year of birth unknown
20th-century Mexican educators
Elected officials who died without taking their seats